This is a list of shipwrecks located off the coast of Massachusetts.

Barnstable County
Due to its dangerously hidden and constantly moving shoals located just off-shore, Cape Cod's coastline from Chatham to Provincetown – a mere fifty-mile stretch of sea – has been called an "ocean graveyard", containing over 3,000 shipwrecks.

Bristol County

Dukes County

Essex County

Nantucket County

Plymouth County

Suffolk County

References

Massachusetts
History of Massachusetts
Shipwrecks